West Main Street Historic District is a national historic district located at Chesterfield, Chesterfield County, South Carolina.  The district encompasses 13 contributing buildings in a primarily residential section of the town of Chesterfield dating from about 1858 to 1930. They include the ornate, Gothic Revival Austin-Craig House, built in 1858, and two churches, a school, and five larger residences built between 1900–1930. Many properties are of brick construction. Freedmen of the community built one of the churches in the district in 1878, and it is the only identified ecclesiastical building in Chesterfield to have survived this period. One early commercial building, now used as apartments, is also included in the historic district.

It was listed on the National Register of Historic Places in 1982.

References

Historic districts on the National Register of Historic Places in South Carolina
Gothic Revival architecture in South Carolina
Buildings and structures in Chesterfield County, South Carolina
National Register of Historic Places in Chesterfield County, South Carolina
Chesterfield, South Carolina